RetrobyPulp Tales is a limited edition anthology published by Subterranean Press in 2006, edited by Joe R. Lansdale. It tied in winning the 2006 Bram Stoker Award for Best Anthology (the other winning title was "Mondo Zombie" edited by John Skipp).

It contains new stories written in the style of the pulp magazines of the early 20th century. Lansdale's guidelines for Retro Pulp Tales were basic: "Write a story in the vein of the old pulps ... that takes place before 1960, and with the restrictions of those times."

It includes contributions by Bill Crider, Stephen Gallagher, Melissa Mia Hall, Alex Irvine, Tim Lebbon, Kim Newman, Norman Partridge, Gary Phillips, James Reasoner, Al Sarrantonio, Chet Williamson, and F. Paul Wilson. This collection was issued as a trade hardcover, a numbered limited edition, and a lettered special edition. All issues have long since sold out.

Table of Contents
Devil Wings Over France: A DeadbyStick Malloy Story by James Reasoner
From the Back Pages by Chet Williamson
The Body Lies by Tim Lebbon
New Game in Town by Alex Irvine
Incident on Hill 19 by Gary Phillips
Zekiel Saw the Wheel by Bill Crider
The Box by Stephen Gallagher
Sex Slaves of the Dragon Tong by F. Paul Wilson
Clubland Heroes by Kim Newman
Summer by Al Sarrantonio
Alien Love at Zero Break by Melissa Mia Hall
Carrion by Norman Partridge

References

External links
Editors Website
Subterranean Press Website

2006 anthologies
American anthologies
Horror anthologies
Works by Joe R. Lansdale